Tango and Thrash is a Split EP by American thrashcore bands Municipal Waste and Bad Acid Trip released under Amendment Records. Tracks 1-5 by Municipal Waste. Tracks 6-9 by Bad Acid Trip.

The album cover features Snake Plissken from Escape from New York.

Track listing

Personnel
Bad Acid Trip
 Dirk Rogers — vocals
 Keith Aazami — guitars, banjos, vocals
 Chris Mackie — bass
 Carlos neri — drums

Municipal Waste
 Tony Foresta - vocals
 Ryan Waste - guitar
 Andy Harris - bass
 Brendan Trache - drums

References

2004 EPs
Bad Acid Trip EPs
Municipal Waste (band) EPs